Lu Mei (born 16 April 1997) is a Chinese professional racing cyclist. She last rode for the UCI Women's Team  during the 2019 women's road cycling season.

References

External links

1997 births
Living people
Chinese female cyclists
Place of birth missing (living people)
21st-century Chinese women